"Thank God It's Friday" is a 1978 disco song by the studio disco group Love & Kisses, popularized as the theme song of the film by the same name.  It was written by European composer and producer Alec R. Costandinos.  Along with the tracks: "Last Dance" by Donna Summer, "After Dark" by Pattie Brooks, and "Take it to the Zoo" by Sunshine, "Thank God It's Friday", peaked at #1 on Billboards Disco charts. On other US charts, "Thank God It's Friday" went to #23 on the Hot Soul Singles chart and #22 on the Hot 100.

Chart performance

Popular culture
Over the years some radio stations would play the song at 5:00 p.m. on Fridays to mark the end of the work week and get its audience pumped-up for the weekend.

References

1978 singles
Disco songs
Casablanca Records singles
1978 songs
Songs written by Alec R. Costandinos
Songs about dancing